Brighton Munthali (born 11 December 1997) is a Malawian professional footballer who plays as a goalkeeper for Silver Strikers and the Malawi national team.

Club career
Munthali signed with Silver Strikers ahead of the 2016 Super League of Malawi season after his team, FISD Wizards, were relegated.

International career
Munthali represented the national under-20 team.

He made his senior international debut on 7 October 2015, at the 2018 World Cup qualifier, in a 2–0 defeat to Tanzania, resulting in an aggregate of 2–1 defeat.

He appeared at two 2022 World Cup qualifiers on 7 September and 10 September 2019, in a 1–0 aggregate victory against Botswana.

References

External links
 
 

1997 births
Living people
Malawian footballers
Malawi international footballers
Malawi under-20 international footballers
Association football goalkeepers
Silver Strikers FC players
People from Mzimba District